Madame du Barry is a 1954 French-Italian historical drama film directed by Christian-Jaque and starring Martine Carol, Daniel Ivernel, Gianna Maria Canale and Jean Parédès. The film depicts the life of Madame du Barry, mistress to Louis XV in the eighteenth century. It was shot at the Saint-Maurice Studios in Paris. The film's sets were designed by the art director Robert Gys.

Cast
 Martine Carol as Jeanne Bécu
 Daniel Ivernel as Jean du Barry
 Gianna Maria Canale as Duchesse de Grammont
 Jean Parédès as Lebel
 Denis d'Inès as Duc d'Richelieu
 Marguerite Pierry as Comtesse de Médarne
 Isabelle Pia as Marie-Antoinette
 Pascale Roberts as Jeanne's friend
 Nadine Alari as La Maréchale de Guichelais 
 Giovanna Ralli as Cadette 
 Georgette Anys as La citoyenne 
 Nadine Tallier as Loque 
 Nane Germon as Bitchi du Barry
 Suzanne Grey as Chon du Barr
 Claude Sylvain as Une fille 
 Paul Demange as Un citoyen 
 André Bervil as Un musicien 
 Michel Etcheverry as L'abbé de Beauvais 
 Serge Grand as Louis XVI 
 Olivier Mathot as Molet
 Robert Murzeau as Un seigneur 
 Gabrielle Dorziat as La Gourdan 
 Massimo Serato as Choiseul 
 Umberto Melnati as Curtins 
 Noël Roquevert as Guillaume du Barry 
 André Luguet as Louis XV
 Marcelle Praince as Mme du Barry, mère

References

Bibliography
 Hayward, Susan. French Costume Drama of the 1950s: Fashioning Politics in Film. Intellect Books, 2010.

External links

1954 films
Italian historical drama films
1950s French-language films
Films directed by Christian-Jaque
French historical drama films
1950s historical drama films
Films set in the 18th century
Films produced by Angelo Rizzoli
Cultural depictions of Louis XV
Cultural depictions of Madame du Barry
Cultural depictions of Marie Antoinette
1954 drama films
1950s French films
1950s Italian films